Phniet is a khum (commune) of Serei Saophoan District in Banteay Meanchey Province in north-western Cambodia.

Villages

 Kantuot(កន្ទួត)
 Kampring(កំព្រីង)
 Phniet
 Neak Ta(អ្នកថា)
 Thmei(ថ្មី)
 Bangruh(បង្រះ)
 Sala Krau(សាលាក្រៅ)

References

Communes of Banteay Meanchey province
Serei Saophoan District